Giebichenstein Castle is a castle in Halle (Saale) in Saxony-Anhalt, Germany. It is part of the Romanesque Road (Strasse der Romanik). 

Being a Burgward in the 9th century, the castle became a royal residence of Otto I, Holy Roman Emperor, who gave it to the Archbishopric of Magdeburg which he had established in 968. Halle had practically reached a state of political autonomy in 1263. The same happened with Magdeburg and when the archbishops finally left Magdeburg, after a series of conflicts with the ever more powerful city council, Giebichenstein Castle became their principal residence in 1382, which it remained until the archbishops moved into the newly built Moritzburg (Halle) in 1503. 

The lower castle (German: Unterburg) is one of the two campuses of the Burg Giebichenstein Kunsthochschule Halle (Burg Giebichenstein University of Art and Design).

References

Castles in Saxony-Anhalt
Landmarks in Germany
Romanesque Road
Buildings and structures in Halle (Saale)